Bowen Cirque is a cirque north-northeast of Mount Wegener in the Read Mountains, Shackleton Range. It was photographed from the air by the U.S. Navy, 1967, and surveyed by the British Antarctic Survey, 1968–71. In association with the names of geologists grouped in this area, it was named by the UK Antarctic Place-Names Committee in 1971 after Norman Levi Bowen, American experimental petrologist who specialized in the phase equilibria of silicate melt systems.

References
 

Cirques of Coats Land